Shaul Gordon (born July 11, 1994) is a Canadian fencer in the sabre discipline. Gordon has represented the country on the international stage since 2013, and has competed at two Pan American Games and six World Fencing Championships. Gordon formerly resided in Richmond, British Columbia, but now lives and trains in Montreal, Quebec.

Career 
In 2015, Gordon represented Canada at the 2015 Pan American Games in Toronto, where he picked up a silver medal in the team sabre event. Four years later at the 2019 Pan American Games in Lima, Peru, he finished second in the team sabre and third in the individual sabre event. Gordon finished in eighth place in the individual event at the 2019 World Fencing Championships, the highest finish ever by a Canadian in the discipline.

Olympics
Gordon has qualified to represent Canada at the 2020 Summer Olympics and competed in the men's individual sabre event.

References

External links
 

1994 births
Canadian male fencers
Living people
Fencers at the 2015 Pan American Games
Fencers at the 2019 Pan American Games
Fencers from Montreal
Pan American Games silver medalists for Canada
Pan American Games bronze medalists for Canada
Pan American Games medalists in fencing
Medalists at the 2015 Pan American Games
Medalists at the 2019 Pan American Games
Fencers at the 2020 Summer Olympics
Olympic fencers of Canada
People from Richmond, British Columbia
Sportspeople from Tel Aviv
Sportspeople from British Columbia